The 2005-06 Utah Jazz season was the team's 32nd in the NBA. They began the season hoping to improve upon their 26-56 output from the previous season. They managed to improve by 15 games, finishing 41-41, but failed to qualify for the playoffs for the third straight season.

On March 23, 2006, the Jazz' retired Karl Malone's jersey number 32 on his rafters reunited with his former teammate John Stockton, Frank Layden, his son Scott Layden, Jeff Hornacek, Mark Eaton, Antoine Carr, and head coach Jerry Sloan.

Draft picks

Roster

Regular season

Season standings

Record vs. opponents

Game log

Player statistics

Awards and records
 Andrei Kirilenko, NBA All-Defensive First Team
 Deron Williams, NBA All-Rookie Team 1st Team

References

Utah Jazz seasons
Utah
Utah
Utah